The Flood Range is an Antarctic range of large snow-covered mountains extending in an E-W direction for about 96 km (60 mi) and forming a right angle with the southern end of the Ames Range in Marie Byrd Land.

Discovered by the Byrd Antarctic Expedition in 1934 from a great distance. Reconnaissance flights by the USAS (1939–41) explored the range. The principle mountain was named "Mount Hal Flood" by Byrd for his uncle, the Hon. Henry D. Flood, U.S. Representative from Virginia. The name was subsequently transferred by US-SCAN from the mountain to the entire range. Mount Hal Flood is now known officially as Mount Berlin.  Other mountains in this range include Mount Moulton and Mount Bursey.

The Flood Range consists of a linear volcanic chain of peaks in which there have been systematic migrations of  felsic activity.  This activity has moved 90 km from east to west between 9 million and 2.5 million years ago, and 154 km northward from the south end of the Ames Range toward Shepard Island between 12.7 and 0.6 million years ago.

Sources

 
Volcanoes of Marie Byrd Land
Miocene shield volcanoes
Pliocene shield volcanoes
Pleistocene shield volcanoes